Scrobipalpa trychnophylla is a moth in the family Gelechiidae. It was described by Anthonie Johannes Theodorus Janse in 1960. It is found in Zambia.

References

Scrobipalpa
Moths described in 1960